Aborino is a rural locality (a village) in Aksyono-Butyrskoye Rural Settlement of Noginsky District, Moscow Oblast, Russia. The population was 69 as of 2010. There are 3 streets.

Geography 
Aborino is located 15 km west of Noginsk (the district's administrative centre) by road. Oborino Lyuks is the nearest rural locality.

References 

Rural localities in Moscow Oblast
Populated places in Noginsky District